John Robert Schrieffer (May 31, 1931 – July 27, 2019) was an American physicist who, with John Bardeen and Leon Cooper, was a recipient of the 1972 Nobel Prize in Physics for developing the BCS theory, the first successful quantum theory of superconductivity.

Life and career 
Schrieffer was born in Oak Park, Illinois, the son of Louise (Anderson) and John Henry Schrieffer. His family moved in 1940 to Manhasset, New York, and then in 1947 to Eustis, Florida, where his father, a former pharmaceutical salesman, began a career in the citrus industry. In his Florida days, Schrieffer enjoyed playing with homemade rockets and ham radio, a hobby that sparked an interest in electrical engineering.

After graduating from Eustis High School in 1949, Schrieffer was admitted to the Massachusetts Institute of Technology, where for two years he majored in electrical engineering before switching to physics in his junior year. He completed a bachelor's thesis on multiplets in heavy atoms under the direction of John C. Slater in 1953. Pursuing an interest in solid-state physics, Schrieffer began graduate studies at the University of Illinois at Urbana–Champaign, where he was hired immediately as a research assistant to Bardeen. After working out a theoretical problem of electrical conduction on semiconductor surfaces, Schrieffer spent a year in the laboratory, applying the theory to several surface problems. In his third year of graduate studies, he joined Bardeen and Cooper in developing the theory of superconductivity.

Schrieffer recalled that in January 1957 he was on a subway in New York City when he had an idea of how to describe mathematically the ground state of superconducting electrons. Schrieffer and Bardeen's collaborator Cooper had discovered that electrons in a superconductor are grouped in pairs, now called Cooper pairs, and that the motions of all Cooper pairs within a single superconductor are correlated and function as a single entity due to phonon-electron interactions. Schrieffer's mathematical breakthrough was to describe the behavior of all Cooper pairs at the same time, instead of each individual pair. The day after returning to Illinois, Schrieffer showed his equations to Bardeen, who immediately realized they were the solution to the problem. The BCS theory (Bardeen-Cooper-Schrieffer) of superconductivity, as it is now known, accounted for more than 30 years of experimental results that had stymied some of the greatest theorists in physics.

After completing his doctoral dissertation on the theory of superconductivity, Schrieffer spent the 1957–1958 academic year as a National Science Foundation fellow at the University of Birmingham in England and at the Niels Bohr Institute in Copenhagen, where he continued research into superconductivity. Following a year as assistant professor at the University of Chicago, he returned to the University of Illinois in 1959 as a faculty member. In 1960, he went back to the Bohr Institute for a summer visit, during which he became engaged to Anne Grete Thomsen whom he married at Christmas of that year. Two years later, Schrieffer joined the faculty of the University of Pennsylvania in Philadelphia, and, in 1964, Schrieffer published his book on the BCS theory, Theory of Superconductivity. He held honorary degrees from the Technical University of Munich and the University of Geneva. In 1968 Schrieffer, along with Cooper, were awarded the Comstock Prize in Physics from the National Academy of Sciences. He was awarded the Oliver E. Buckley Condensed Matter Prize by the American Physical Society the same year.

Schrieffer was elected to the American Academy of Arts and Sciences in 1970 and the United States National Academy of Sciences in 1971. In 1972, he, along with Bardeen and Cooper, won the 1972 Nobel Prize in Physics for developing the BCS theory. Schrieffer was elected to the American Philosophical Society in 1975. In 1980, Schrieffer became a professor at the University of California, Santa Barbara, and rose to chancellor professor in 1984, serving as director of the university's Kavli Institute for Theoretical Physics. In 1992, Florida State University appointed Schrieffer as a university eminent scholar professor and chief scientist of the National High Magnetic Field Laboratory, where he continued to pursue one of the great goals in physics: room temperature superconductivity.

On September 24, 2004, while driving with a suspended license, Schrieffer was involved in an automobile accident that killed one person and injured seven others.
Schrieffer was said to have fallen asleep at the wheel of his car. On November 6, 2005, he was sentenced to two years in prison for vehicular manslaughter. Schrieffer was incarcerated in Richard J. Donovan Correctional Facility at Rock Mountain near San Diego, California.

He died in late July 2019 at a nursing facility in Florida while sleeping. He was 88 years old.

See also 
 List of Nobel laureates affiliated with the University of California, Santa Barbara

References

External links 
  including the Nobel Lecture, December 11, 1972 Macroscopic Quantum Phenomena from Pairing in Superconductors

1931 births
2019 deaths
People from Manhasset, New York
Nobel laureates in Physics
American Nobel laureates
National Medal of Science laureates
Fellows of the American Physical Society
Members of the United States National Academy of Sciences
Foreign Members of the USSR Academy of Sciences
Foreign Members of the Russian Academy of Sciences
Florida State University faculty
University of Florida faculty
University of Illinois Urbana-Champaign alumni
University of Illinois Urbana-Champaign faculty
University of Pennsylvania faculty
Scientists from Oak Park, Illinois
Academics of the University of Birmingham
American people of German descent
20th-century American physicists
Scientists from New York (state)
MIT Department of Physics alumni
Oliver E. Buckley Condensed Matter Prize winners
Members of the American Philosophical Society
 prisoners and detainees of California
Presidents of the American Physical Society